Lori Dumas is an American lawyer and jurist. A Democrat, she was elected to the Commonwealth Court of Pennsylvania in November 2021.

References

1967 births
Judges of the Commonwealth Court of Pennsylvania
Living people
Pennsylvania Democrats
Pennsylvania lawyers
Duke University alumni